Mirsamad Pourseyedi Golakhour (born 15 October 1985) is an Iranian cyclist, who currently rides for UCI Continental team . He was suspended from May 2011 to June 2013 because of testing positive to the use of erythropoietin (EPO).

Doping ban
He was suspended from 25 May 2011 to 29 June 2013 because of testing positive to the use of erythropoietin (EPO) during the Tour of Iran in 2011. Upon his return to competition, he won the Tour of Qinghai Lake.

Major results

2007
 1st Stage 3 Taftan Tour
 4th Overall Tour of Azerbaijan (Iran)
 9th Overall Kerman Tour
2008
 4th Road race, National Road Championships
 4th Overall Tour of Azerbaijan (Iran)
 6th Overall Milad De Nour Tour
2009
 7th Overall Milad De Nour Tour
1st Stage 3
2010
 2nd Overall International Presidency Tour
 6th Overall Tour de Singkarak
1st Stage 1 (TTT)
2011
 1st Overall International Presidency Tour
 2nd Overall Kerman Tour
 3rd Road race, National Road Championships
 3rd Overall Tour de Singkarak
1st Stages 3, 6b & 7a
 10th Overall Tour de Filipinas
1st Stage 3
2013
 1st Overall Tour of Qinghai Lake
1st Mountains classification
1st Stage 3
 1st Overall Tour de Ijen
1st Stage 2
 2nd Overall Tour of Borneo
2014
 1st 2013–14 UCI Asia Tour
 1st  Overall Tour de Langkawi
1st  Asian rider classification
1st Stage 4
 1st Overall Tour of Japan
1st Stage 4
 1st Overall Tour of Fuzhou
1st Stage 2
 2nd Overall Tour of Iran (Azerbaijan)
 6th Overall Tour de Ijen
 10th Overall Tour of Qinghai Lake
2015
 1st UCI Asia Tour
 1st  Overall Tour de Taiwan
1st  Mountains classification
1st  Asian rider classification
1st Stage 4
 1st  Overall Tour of Japan
 1st  Overall Tour of Iran (Azerbaijan)
1st  Asian rider classification
1st Stage 5
 4th Time trial, National Road Championships
 4th Overall Tour de Filipinas
1st Stage 4
 7th Overall Tour of Fuzhou
2016
 1st  Overall Tour of Iran (Azerbaijan)
1st  Points classification
1st  Mountains classification
1st  Asian rider classification
1st Stage 4
 2nd Time trial, National Road Championships
 3rd Overall Tour of Japan
1st  Mountains classification
 9th Overall Tour de Taiwan
 10th Road race, Asian Road Championships
2017
 National Road Championships
1st  Time trial
5th Road race
 Asian Road Championships
4th Team time trial
10th Time trial
 5th Overall Tour de Kumano
 8th Overall Tour of Almaty
 9th Overall Tour of Japan
2018
 1st  Time trial, National Road Championships
 2nd  Team time trial, Asian Road Championships
2019
 3rd Overall Tour de Singkarak
2022
 Asian Cycling Championships
3rd  Team time trial
6th Time trial

References

External links

1985 births
Living people
Iranian male cyclists
Iranian sportspeople in doping cases
Doping cases in cycling
Tour of Azerbaijan (Iran) winners
Sportspeople from Tabriz
Cyclists at the 2016 Summer Olympics
Olympic cyclists of Iran
Cyclists at the 2018 Asian Games
Asian Games competitors for Iran
21st-century Iranian people